Mougnini Guy-Stephane Tape (born December 15, 1990) is an Ivorian footballer who formerly played for Georgian side FC Merani Martvili.

External links 

1990 births
Living people
Ivorian footballers
Association football midfielders
Maccabi Petah Tikva F.C. players